The Black Panther Warriors is a 1993 Hong Kong action film directed by Clarence Fok and starring an ensemble cast of Alan Tang, Brigitte Lin, Simon Yam, Tony Leung, Dicky Cheung and Carrie Ng.

Plot
Black Cougar (Alan Tang) is a professional thief who charges high fees and had never made a mistake. One night, Cougar was hired by minister Chu (Melvin Wong) to steal a silver box to test the newly installed security system in the police headquarters. Panthers then assembles his team of acquaintances possessing special skills to assistant. They include dart-thrower Madam Rose (Carrie Ng), sharpshooter Mang-po Fai (Tony Leung), gambling expert and card thrower Black Jack Love (Simon Yam), computer genius Robert Parkinson (Dicky Cheung), and Cougar's junior fellow apprentice, Ching-ching (Brigitte Lin). During their operation, they realized that in order for them to activate the security system, they would need to obtain the weight of police officer Fat Wong (Sze Kai-keung) and the fingerprints of his partner Enna (Elsie Chan). When they finally obtain the fingerprints and weight of the two, Cougar proceeds to steal the silver box on his own. However, Cougar was ambushed and was abducted and trapped in a cell by his senior fellow apprentice Bloody Wolf (Yuen Wah). While Wolf was torturing Cougar, Cougar's assistant, Chan-chan (Jennifer Chan) comes to rescue him. Ching-ching also comes and fights Chan-chan, revealing the later to be a traitor. Ching-ching tells Cougar that this was all a setup by Wolf, which originated ten years ago when Wolf killed their mentor and faked his own death in order to obtain the "Cougar Head Blade". Chan-chan also comes back to confess and apologize for her betrayal and reveals that the silver box contains a photographic paper, which turns to be a photo showing Wolf killing his mentor. Cougar therefore decides to battle to the death with Wolf.

Cast
Alan Tang as Black Cougar
Brigitte Lin as Ching-ching
Simon Yam as Black Jack Love
Tony Leung Ka-fai as Mang-po Fai
Dicky Cheung as Robert Parkinson
Carrie Ng as Madam Rose
Jennifer Chan as Chan-chan
Elsie Chan as Enna
Yuen Wah as Bloody Wolf
Melvin Wong as Chu
Pau Fong as Mentor (cameo)
Sze Ka-keung as Fat Wong (cameo)
Lily Lee as Airplane wet nurse (cameo)
Kingdom Yuen (cameo)
Kwan Yung as Thug in final fight scene
Kong Miu-deng

Reception

Critical
Andrew Sarooch of Far East Films gave the film a score of 2 out of 5 stars and criticizes its tasteless comedy and strange characters, but complements it imaginative action sequences.

Box office
The film grossed HK$7,257,468 at the Hong Kong box office during its theatrical run from  18 November to 1 December 1993.

References

External links

The Black Panther Warriors at Hong Kong Cinemagic

1993 films
1993 action comedy films
1993 martial arts films
Hong Kong action comedy films
Hong Kong martial arts films
Hong Kong slapstick comedy films
Hong Kong martial arts comedy films
Martial arts fantasy films
Wuxia films
Gun fu films
1990s Cantonese-language films
Films directed by Clarence Fok
Films set in Hong Kong
Films shot in Hong Kong
1990s Hong Kong films